Aegimus or Aegimius ( or ) was one of the most ancient of the Greek physicians, who is said by Galen to have been the first person who wrote a treatise on the pulse.  He was a native of Velia in Lucania, and is supposed to have lived before the time of Hippocrates, that is, in the 5th century BC.  His work was entitled  (Lat. De Palpitationibus, a name which alone sufficiently indicates its antiquity), which is no longer extant. 

Athenaeus (2nd century AD) mentions that Callimachus (3rd century BC) used to have a work by "Aegimius" that described the art of making cheesecakes, and Pliny the Elder mentions a person of the same name who was said to have lived two hundred years; but whether these are the same or different individuals is quite uncertain.

References

Sources
 

5th-century BC Greek physicians
People from the Province of Salerno